Lars Engberg (27 January 1943 – 17 February 2017) was a Danish politician for the Social Democratic Party. He was a member of the council for Region Hovedstaden and acting Lord Mayor of Copenhagen.

Lars Engberg was a member of the City Council of Copenhagen from 1982 to 2005. When Jens Kramer Mikkelsen resigned from the office of lord mayor of Copenhagen before time on 25 October 2004, Lars Engberg took the office until 31 December 2005, when he was replaced by Ritt Bjerregaard and instead was elected into the council for the newly formed regional council.

Notes

1943 births
2017 deaths
Mayors of places in Denmark
Place of birth missing
Social Democrats (Denmark) politicians
Politicians from Copenhagen

19th-century Copenhagen City Council members
20th-century Copenhagen City Council members